Star World Philippines (stylized as StarWorld) was a 24-hour English language cable and satellite television network owned by STAR TV and Fox Networks Group, fully owned subsidiaries of 21st Century Fox. The channel is the successor of STAR Plus, a subsidiary of 21st Century Fox. Star World syndicates several popular shows from the United States, United Kingdom and sometimes from Australia to appeal to the English-speaking population of the Philippines.

History
Star World (then known as STAR Plus) was STAR's English language entertainment channel which has started its operations on 1 January 1994 and its Indonesia counterpart was Film Indonesia and India was Zee TV. But after STAR ended its partnership with Soraya Intercine FIlms and Zee Telefilm, STAR changed its content from STAR Plus to launch as STAR World on 31 March 1996 which then was known as STAR PLUS International for a brief time (STAR Plus in India was once combine both US and Hindi entertainment until its full transform into a Hindi entertainment channel on 1 July 2000 after its contract with Zee TV ended the previous day).

In the mid-2000s, STAR replaced STAR World's main feed (Southeast Asia) with a Philippine-dedicated feed for Filipino viewers.

Fox Life era
On October 1, 2017, Star World Philippines was rebranded as FOX Life Philippines.

Programming

Former programming

Sitcom
 Benched
 Cougar Town
 Raising Hope
 Life in Pieces
 Melissa & Joey
 New Girl
 Suburgatory
 Trophy Wife
 Happy Endings
 How I Met Your Mother
 Cristela
 Young & Hungry
 2 Broke Girls

Drama
 Crazy Ex-Girlfriend
 Devious Maids
 Grey's Anatomy
 Hindsight
 Parenthood
 Scandal
 Revenge
 Once Upon a Time
 Witches of East End
 Switched At Birth
 Royal Pains
 Mistresses
 Empire
 Scream Queens
 The Catch
 The Royals
 Heartbeat

Reality and lifestyle
 4 Girls and a Bucket List
 America's Next Top Model
 MasterChef
 MasterChef Junior
 Asia's Next Top Model
 Bolt of Talent
 Australia's Next Top Model
 Harry
 The Bachelor
 Britain's Next Top Model
 Styled to Rock
 The Rachel Zoe Project
 The Voice
 Million Dollar Listing LA
 DC Cupcakes
 Fit for Fashion
 Got To Dance
 Strictly Come Dancing
 Dancing with the Stars US
 Amazing Wedding Cakes
 My Fair Wedding with David Tutera
 The Fashion Fund

Events
 Asian Television Awards
 Golden Globe Award
 People's Choice Award
 Critic's Choice Movie Awards
 Grammy Award
 Brit awards
 Miss USA
 Miss Universe
 Miss World
 Miss Earth
 Miss Asia Pacific International
 Miss Supranational
 Victoria's Secret Fashion Show

Local programming
 The Bag Hag Diaries
 She Said Yes

See also
Star World

References

External links
 (Philippines)
 (Philippines)

Television channels and stations established in 1994
English-language television stations in the Philippines
Women's interest channels